MKSSS's Cummins College of Engineering for Women, Nagpur (CCOEW, Nagpur) is an RTMNU affiliated college with NAAC (B++) Accreditation in Nagpur, Maharashtra India run by Maharshi Karve Stree Shikshan Samstha.

History 
Maharshi Karve Stree Shikshan Samstha, (MKSSS), Pune is a Parent organization which is a 121-year-old institution. The organization is aimed towards women education & women empowerment in the society.

MKSSS's, Pune established first women engineering college in Pune called MKSSS's Cummins College of Engineering for Women, Over the course of 119 years the Parent organization has branched out more institutions in other districts in Maharashtra State. The institutes are located at Pune, Nagpur, Satara, Wai, Ratnagiri, Kamshet, etc. The Cummins College of Engineering for Women Located in Nagpur is affiliated to Rashtrasant Tukadoji Maharaj Nagpur University

Academics 
Cummins College of Engineering, Nagpur provides undergraduate programs in various displines of engineering such as Allied Sciences which are also related to Research and Development, Computer Engineering, Electronics and Telecommunications Engineering, Mechanical Engineering and Consultancy.

Campus Facilities 
The campus is spread across 13 acres near river Vena in Nagpur. Cummins College features a hostel facility for all outstation students that can house up to 180 students currently, which is to be extended to 700 students shortly. Transportation facilities are also provided for day scholars who attende the college. The institution also features grounds for activities such as Kabaddi, Badminton, Cricket and Volley Ball. Indoor arenas are available for Table Tennis, Carrom and Chess. A gym facility is also available for all students and staff.

ED CELL 
The ED-CELL exists at the institute to polish the entrepreneurship skills of the students. The ED-CELL helps bridge the gap between the ideas to a marketable product.

References

External links 
Official Website
https://web.archive.org/web/20171217142431/http://cumminscollege.edu.in/institute-profile.php
 https://timesofindia.indiatimes.com/city/pune/Pune-engineering-college-for-women-registers-strong-placements/articleshow/20700654.cms

Women's engineering colleges in India
Women's universities and colleges in Maharashtra
Rashtrasant Tukadoji Maharaj Nagpur University
Universities and colleges in Maharashtra